The 2020 Wyoming Cowboys football team represented the University of Wyoming during the 2020 NCAA Division I FBS football season. The season was suspended on August 10, 2020, however, the Mountain West Conference board of directors later decided to play an eight-game season, starting on October 24. The Cowboys played their home games at War Memorial Stadium as members of the Mountain West Conference. They were led by seventh-year head coach Craig Bohl.

Previous season
The Cowboys finished the 2019 season 8–5, 4–4 in Mountain West play to finish in fourth place in the Mountain Division. They played in the Arizona Bowl, where they defeated Georgia State 38–17.

2020 recruiting class
The Cowboys announced an early signing class of 18 high school student athletes on December 18, 2019. A day later, the Cowboys added tackle Emmanuel Pregnon. On February 5, 2020, the Cowboys added five more recruits.

Preseason

Award watch lists
Listed in the order that they were released

Mountain West media days
Mountain West media days were originally scheduled for July 16–17 at SoFi Stadium in Los Angeles, California, but were canceled in favor of virtual media days due to the COVID-19 pandemic. On July 20, the virtual media days were canceled. The division predicted order of finish was released July 21, the preseason all-conference team was released on July 22, and preseason individual awards were released on July 23.

Wyoming was picked to finish 2nd in the Mountain Division in the Mountain West preseason poll. The divisions were later suspended for the 2020 season.

Media poll

Preseason All-Mountain West

Personnel

Coaching staff

Roster

Schedule
Wyoming announced its 2020 football schedule on February 26, 2020. The 2020 schedule consisted of 6 home and 6 away games in the regular season. On August 10, 2020, the Mountain West Conference announced the suspension of the football season due to the COVID-19 pandemic. On September 25, the Mountain West Conference announced that they would be playing an eight-game schedule, to start October 24. The team's non conference games against Weber State, Louisiana, Utah, and Ball State remained canceled. Additionally, a game against Hawaii replaced a game against San Diego State. On November 8, the scheduled November 14 game against Air Force was canceled by the Mountain West Conference due to an uptick in COVID–19 cases within the Air Force football team and Academy. On November 18, the scheduled November 19 game against Utah State was canceled by the Mountain West Conference due to rising COVID–19 cases in the Utah State program.

Source

Statistics

Team

Offense

Defense

Key: SOLO: Solo Tackles, AST: Assisted Tackles, TOT: Total Tackles, TFL: Tackles-for-loss, SACK: Quarterback Sacks, INT: Interceptions, BU: Passes Broken Up, QBH: Quarterback Hits, FF: Forced Fumbles, FR: Fumbles Recovered, BLK: Kicks or Punts Blocked, SAF: Safeties

Special teams

Awards and honors

All–conference teams
All–Mountain West teams were announced on December 15, 2020.

Honorable Mentions
Esaias Gandy, Sr., DB
Logan Harris, Sr., OL
Isaiah Neyor, Fr., WR

Game summaries

at Nevada

Passing leaders: Levi Williams (WYO): 16–31, 227 YDS, 1 TD, 1 INT; Carson Strong (NEV): 39–52, 420 YDS, 4 TD
Rushing leaders: Xazavian Valladay (WYO): 22 CAR, 87 YDS; Devonte Lee (NEV): 18 CAR, 65 YDS
Receiving leaders: Isaiah Neyor (WYO): 3 REC, 102 YDS; Cole Turner (NEV): 7 REC, 119 YDS, 2 TD

Hawaii

Passing leaders: Levi Williams (WYO): 9–18, 112 YDS; Chevan Cordeiro (HAW): 11–26, 110 YDS, 1 INT
Rushing leaders: Xazavian Valladay (WYO): 32 CAR, 163 YDS, 2 TD; Miles Reed (HAW): 7 CAR, 54 YDS
Receiving leaders: Xazavian Valladay (WYO): 2 REC, 32 YDS; Zion Bowens (HAW): 1 REC, 47 YDS

at Colorado State

Passing leaders: Levi Williams (WYO): 19–31, 321 YDS, 1 INT; Patrick O'Brien (CSU): 18–26, 255 YDS, 2 TD
Rushing leaders: Xazavian Valladay (WYO): 28 CAR, 147 YDS, 1 TD; A'Jon Vivens (CSU): 14 CAR, 62 YDS
Receiving leaders: Ayden Eberhardt (WYO): 7 REC, 132 YDS; Dante Wright (CSU): 10 REC, 146 YDS

at UNLV

Passing leaders: Levi Williams (WYO): 8–14, 99 YDS; Doug Brumfield (UNLV): 4–8, 93 YDS
Rushing leaders: Trey Smith (WYO): 24 CAR, 164 YDS, 1 TD; Max Gilliam (UNLV): 12 CAR, 63 YDS, 1 TD
Receiving leaders: Ayden Eberhardt (WYO): 3 REC, 42 YDS; Kyle Williams (UNLV): 4 REC, 71 YDS

at New Mexico

Passing leaders: Levi Williams (WYO): 4–12, 73 YDS, 1 INT; Isaiah Chavez (UNM): 5–10, 55 YDS, 1 TD
Rushing leaders: Trey Smith (WYO): 24 CAR, 154 YDS, 1 TD; Bobby Cole (UNM): 22 CAR, 131 YDS
Receiving leaders: Isaiah Neyor (WYO): 1 REC, 54 YDS; Bobby Cole (UNM): 2 REC, 53 YDS

Boise State

Passing leaders: Levi Williams (WYO): 3–13, 45 YDS; Hank Bachmeier (BSU): 19–28, 181 YDS, 1 TD, 1 INT
Rushing leaders: Xazavian Valladay (WYO): 11 CAR, 59 YDS; Andrew Van Buren (BSU): 25 CAR, 79 YDS, 1 TD
Receiving leaders: Xazavian Valladay (WYO): 1 REC, 29 YDS; Khalil Shakir (BSU): 8 REC, 105 YDS

References

Wyoming
Wyoming Cowboys football seasons
Wyoming Cowboys football